Fester or Fester's may refer to:

Fester Bestertester, a character created by cartoonist Don Martin
Fester Hollow, a tributary of the West Branch Briar Creek in Columbia County, Pennsylvania
Fester Kun Med Mig Selv, a single by Danish singer Jon Nørgaard
Uncle Fester, or Fester Addams, a member of the fictional Addams Family
Uncle Fester (author), the nom de plume of Steve Preisler, author
Fester's Quest, a video game

See also
Pus, an exudate formed at the site of inflammation during infection